Pretend We're Kissing is a 2014 Canadian romantic comedy drama film written and directed by Matt Sadowski and starring Dov Tiefenbach, Tommie-Amber Pirie and Zoë Kravitz.

Cast
Dov Tiefenbach as Benny
Tommie-Amber Pirie as Jordan
Zoë Kravitz as Autumn
Loretta Yu as Lily
David Reale as Bus Boy
Andy McQueen as Jay
Rainbow Sun Francks as Henri
Rodrigo Fernandez-Stoll as Host

Release
The film was released theatrically in Toronto, Ottawa and Vancouver on April 3, 2015.

Reception
The film has an 83 percent rating on Rotten Tomatoes based on six reviews.

Brad Wheeler of The Globe and Mail gave the film a positive review and wrote, "the likable indie flick will connect with both hip cynics and those with rosier hopes."

Bruce DeMara of the Toronto Star awarded the film two and a half stars out of four and wrote, "Still, there’s just enough kooky appeal and wit to make Pretend We’re Kissing a romantic comedy that’s also a cautionary tale."

Barry Hertz of the National Post also gave the film a positive review and wrote, "Whatever your thoughts on the film’s central up-and-down relationship, though, you can’t help but fall in love with the way Sadowski frames the scenery."

References

External links
 
 

2010s English-language films